Ayana Dyette (10 January 1986 – 1 July 2018) was a Trinidad and Tobago volleyball player. She was part of the Trinidad and Tobago women's national volleyball team.

She participated in the 2015 Pan-American Games in Toronto, Canada.
She also participated at the FIVB world tour held in United States.

Education 
Ayanna was a student of Holy Name Convent, Port-of-Spain, after which she received a volleyball scholarship to attend the Indian State college where she got her degree in Business Administration and Management. 
She also pursued her Bachelor of Science degree in Business, Management and Marketing and Related support services at the Delaware State University from 2006 to 2008.

Career 
Ayanna was the Public Relations Officer during the presidentship of Mushtaque Mohammed.

In February 2014, she worked as the Financial Advisor with the Panamerican Life Insurance.

She was also the Customer Service Representative with RBC bank from October 2012 to April 2013.

Death 
She died of cervical cancer.

Tributes 
1. Hon. Shamfa Cudjoe, Minister of Sport and Youth Affairs of Trinidad and Tobago gave Ayanna a tribute.

2. Trinidad and Tobago Olympic Committee

References

1986 births
2018 deaths
Place of birth missing
Trinidad and Tobago women's volleyball players
Deaths from cervical cancer
Delaware State University alumni